Eeckhout is a Flemish surname. Notable people with the surname include:

Gerbrand van den Eeckhout (1621–1674), painter
Jacobus Josephus Eeckhout (1793–1861), painter
Niko Eeckhout (born 1970), cyclist
Tom Eeckhout (born 1989), real name of singer Tom Dice